Mel-chengam is a panchayat town in Chengam taluk of Thiruvannamalai district Tamil Nadu India. It is the first place in district by means of Bangalore road. It is having the population of 4890 in the altitude of 272 m from sea level.

Cities and towns in Tiruvannamalai district